Agorism is a social philosophy that advocates creating a society in which all relations between people are voluntary exchanges by means of counter-economics, engaging with aspects of nonviolent revolution. Agorism has similar elements to Anarcho-capitalism, but unlike some anarcho-capitalists, most Agorists are strictly opposed to voting as a strategy for achieving their desired outcomes.  It was first proposed by American libertarian philosopher Samuel Edward Konkin III (1947–2004) at two conferences, CounterCon I in October 1974 and CounterCon II in May 1975.

Etymology
The term was coined by Samuel Edward Konkin III and comes from the word agora, referring to an open place for assembly and market in a polis (city-state).

Origins
According to Konkin, agorism and counter-economics were originally fighting concepts forged in the revolutionary atmosphere of 1972 and 1973. Konkin credits the Austrian School and particularly Ludwig von Mises as the base of economic thought leading to agorism and counter-economics.

In the 1960–1970s, there was an abundance of political alienation in the United States, particularly for those in favor of libertarian ideologies. Whereas Murray Rothbard chose to create political alliances between the Old Right and the New Left, Robert LeFevre and his West Coast followers pursued a non-participatory form of civil disobedience.

LeFevre's anti-collaboration methods ultimately lost favor and faded away. According to Konkin, after the creation of the Libertarian Party in 1971, the debate shifted from anarchy vs. minarchism to partyarchy vs. agorism.

Ideology

Konkin characterized agorism as a form of anti-capitalist left-libertarianism, and, generally, that agorism is a strategic branch of left-wing market anarchism. Although this term is non-standard usage, agorists identify as part of left-wing politics in the general sense and use the term left-libertarian as defined by Roderick T. Long, i.e. as "an integration, or I'd argue, a reintegration of libertarianism with concerns that are traditionally thought of as being concerns of the left. That includes concerns for worker empowerment, worry about plutocracy, concerns about feminism and various kinds of social equality".

Counter-economics

The concept of counter-economics is the most critical element of agorism. It can be described as such:

Profitable civil disobedience
Agorism advocates for gradual withdrawal of state support through what Konkin described as "Profitable Civil Disobedience". Starving the state of its revenue and purpose by transferring these responsibilities over to decentralized institutions is the most feasible way to achieve free markets according to agorism:

Opposition to political parties
Agorism does not support political engagement in the form of political party promotion as a means to transition to a free-market anarchism. The methods of the Libertarian Party are not compatible with agorist principles. Konkin referred to these attempts to fight for free markets through state approved channels of operation as "partyarchy":

Voluntary association
As with voluntaryists, agorists typically oppose electoral voting and political reform and instead they stress the importance of alternative strategies outside political systems to achieve a free society. Agorists claim that such a society could be freed more readily by employing methods such as education, direct action, alternative currencies, entrepreneurship, self sufficiency, civil disobedience and counter-economics.

Konkin's class theory
Wally Conger developed (based on work of Konkin) a class theory which includes entrepreneurs, non-statist capitalists and statist capitalists:

Konkin claimed that while agorists see these three classes differently, anarcho-capitalists tend to conflate the first and second types while "Marxists" may conflate all three.

Intellectual property
Konkin opposed the concept of intellectual property and wrote in an article entitled "Copywrongs" in support of such a thesis. J. Neil Schulman criticized this thesis in "Informational Property: Logorights". Whereas Konkin was opposed to the laws of the state in the cases of patents and copyright, seen as creators of monopolies and distortion, Schulman agreed with Konkin that the state could not be a foundation for any class of rightful property yet sought to demonstrate that exclusive ownership rights could apply to what he ultimately termed "Media Carried Property"—created objects that exist independent of the subjective human mind yet are not themselves made of atoms or molecules.

Literature
Konkin's treatise New Libertarian Manifesto was published in 1980. Previously, the philosophy had been presented in J. Neil Schulman's science fiction novel Alongside Night in 1979. Ayn Rand's example, presenting her ideas in the form of a work of fiction in Atlas Shrugged, had inspired Schulman to do likewise. Konkin's afterword to the novel, "How Far Alongside Night?", credited Schulman with integrating the "science of counter-economics" with Konkin's basic economic philosophy.

Other media
J. Neil Schulman adapted Alongside Night as a feature film released in 2014, as a graphic novel, and as an unabridged audiobook.

See also

 Blockchain
 Cryptocurrency
 Debates within libertarianism
 Distributism
 Economic activism
 Economic secession
 Expropriative anarchism
 Hawala
 Illegalism
 Individualist anarchism
 Insurrectionary anarchism
 Informal sector (or grey economy)
 Issues in anarchism
 Libertarian municipalism
 Local exchange trading system
 Mutualism
 Philosophical anarchism
 Piracy
 Prefigurative politics
 Ross Ulbricht
 Sharing economy
 Silk Road (marketplace)
 System D
 Underground economy

References

 
1975 introductions
Economic ideologies
Free market
Anti-capitalism
Left-libertarianism
Libertarianism by form
Libertarianism in the United States